Miaromima is a genus of moths of the family Nolidae. The genus was erected by Edward Meyrick in 1889.

It is now considered by Butterflies and Moths of the World to be a synonym of Westermannia.

Species
 Miaromima aquila (Holloway, 1982)
 Miaromima coelisigna (Hampson, 1895)
 Miaromima columbina (Warren, 1914)
 Miaromima cornucopia (Hampson, 1891)
 Miaromima dinotis (Meyrick, 1889)
 Miaromima naessigi (Kobes, 1989)
 Miaromima pangolina (Holloway, 1982)

References

Nolidae